Events from the year 1533 in Sweden

Incumbents
 Monarch – Gustav I

Events

 February -  The third of the Dalecarlian Rebellions is suppressed with the execution of its leaders.
 - Olaus Petri is replaced as royal chancellor. 
 - The city of Lidköping is burned down by a fire.

Births

 13 December - Eric XIV of Sweden, monarch  (died 1577)

Deaths

References

 
Years of the 16th century in Sweden
Sweden